
Kanden may refer to:

Entertainment

Film
Kanden Seethaiyai, the Tamil translation of the film 9 Nelalu
Kanden Seethaiyai (unreleased film), a planned film remake of Ammayane Sathyam
Kanden Kadhalai, a 2009 Indian Tamil romantic comedy film
Kandaen, another Indian Tamil romantic comedy film released in 2011

Music
"Kanden", a song from Stray Sheep

Video games
Kanden, a fictional bounty hunter in Metroid Prime Hunters

Transportation
Kanden Tunnel Trolleybus, a Japanese trolly bus line